Pat Mayer (born July 24, 1961) is an American former professional ice hockey player who played one game in the National Hockey League (NHL) with the Pittsburgh Penguins during the 1987–88 season.

Career
Defenseman Pat Mayer played one game for the Pittsburgh Penguins in 1987–88, on March 20, 1988 against the Philadelphia Flyers. He played an abrasive physical game and doled out many a punishing hit in college and the minors.

Born in Royal Oak, Michigan, Mayer spent three years at the United States International University in San Diego, California. Undrafted by an NHL club, he agreed to turn pro with the IHL's Toledo Goaldiggers in 1985–86. Before the end of the season, he was traded to the Muskegon Lumberjacks where he remained another year.

The burly rearguard signed with Pittsburgh in July, 1987 and made it into one NHL game. He returned to the IHL for the balance of the schedule and led the league with 450 penalty minutes. Mayer retired in 1989 after playing most of the year in Muskegon. A late season trade to the Los Angeles Kings resulted in him spending the last month of his pro career with the AHL's New Haven Nighthawks.

Career statistics

Regular season and playoffs

See also
 List of players who played only one game in the NHL

References

External links
 

1961 births
Living people
American men's ice hockey defensemen
Ice hockey players from Michigan
Muskegon Lumberjacks players
New Haven Nighthawks players
Sportspeople from Royal Oak, Michigan
Pittsburgh Penguins players
Quebec Remparts players
Toledo Goaldiggers players
Undrafted National Hockey League players
United States International Gulls men's ice hockey players